Ricardo Rodríguez Rocha (born 20 January 1962) is a Mexican politician affiliated with the Institutional Revolutionary Party. As of 2014 he served as Deputy of the LIX Legislature of the Mexican Congress representing Coahuila.

References

1962 births
Living people
Politicians from Monclova
Institutional Revolutionary Party politicians
Universidad Regiomontana alumni
21st-century Mexican politicians
Deputies of the LIX Legislature of Mexico
Members of the Chamber of Deputies (Mexico) for Coahuila